Alfredo Gómez Urcuyo (born August 19, 1942 in Rivas, Nicaragua), is a Nicaraguan Liberalist politician. Gómez was a substitute member of the National Assembly of Nicaragua from 1997 to 2005. On October 10, 2005, he was elected Vice President of Nicaragua upon the resignation of José Rizo to serve out the remainder of the term until 10 January 2007.

References

1942 births
Living people
People from Rivas Department
Vice presidents of Nicaragua
Members of the National Assembly (Nicaragua)